The 2020 Holiday Bash was the inaugural Holiday Bash professional wrestling Christmas television special produced by All Elite Wrestling (AEW). The event took place at Daily's Place in Jacksonville, Florida on December 17, 2020, and aired on tape delay on December 23. It was broadcast on TNT as a special episode of AEW's weekly television program, Dynamite. It aired immediately following the NBA on TNT broadcast of the Celtics vs Bucks game.

Production

Background
On December 9, 2020, All Elite Wrestling (AEW) announced that the December 23 episode of their flagship television program, Dynamite, would be a special episode titled Holiday Bash. The Christmas television special was taped on December 17 at Daily's Place in Jacksonville, Florida due to the ongoing COVID-19 pandemic. TNT aired the Boston Celtics vs. Milwaukee Bucks National Basketball Association game prior to Dynamites normal 8pm Eastern Time (ET) slot; however, with the expectation that the game would go past 8pm, Holiday Bash was scheduled to air immediately following the game's conclusion.

Storylines
Holiday Bash featured professional wrestling matches that involved different wrestlers from pre-existing scripted feuds and storylines. Wrestlers portrayed heroes, villains, or less distinguishable characters in scripted events that built tension and culminated in a wrestling match or series of matches. Storylines were produced on AEW's weekly television program, Dynamite, the supplementary online streaming show, Dark, and The Young Bucks' YouTube series Being The Elite.

Aftermath
A second Holiday Bash was held the following year, thus establishing Holiday Bash as an annual Christmas television special for AEW. Additionally, the second event expanded the special to a two-part event, with the first part airing as Dynamite and the second part airing as the same week's episode of Rampage, a second weekly program that began airing in August 2021.

Results

See also
2020 in professional wrestling

References

External links

AEW Holiday Bash
2020 American television episodes
2020s American television specials
2020 in professional wrestling in Florida
2020 in professional wrestling
December 2020 events in the United States
Events in Jacksonville, Florida
Professional wrestling in Jacksonville, Florida
Holidays themed professional wrestling events